The Institute for War & Peace Reporting (IWPR) is an independent nonprofit organization that claims to train and provide publishing opportunities for professional and citizen journalists.

History
IWPR was founded in 1991 under the name Yugofax.  Initially it was a newsletter that reported on the troubling developments throughout the Balkans from a balanced perspective. As the conflict developed into an all out war, Yugofax newsletter changed its name to Balkan War Report.

Eventually, in late 1995, after the Dayton Peace Accord was signed ending the war in Bosnia, the newsletter expanded its area of focus to other global trouble spots (initially mainly focusing on ex-Soviet republics) and adjusted its name to War Report.

In 1998, the newsletter changed its name again to the Institute for War & Peace Reporting and registered as a non-governmental organization.

Deaths of members
On June 7, 2007, IWPR journalist Sahar Hussein al-Haideri, age 44, was murdered by gunmen as she left her home in Mosul. IWPR is establishing a journalists' assistance fund in her name.

On May 2, 2015, the previous IWPR Iraq director, Ammar Al Shahbander, was killed in a car bomb attack, along with up to 17 other people.

On October 18, 2015, the IWPR acting Iraq director, Jacqueline Anne Sutton (a.k.a. Jacky Sutton), age 50, was found hanged in a bathroom stall of Istanbul's Atatürk International Airport. She had been on her way to Irbil.

On 6 July 2020, Hisham al-Hashimi was seriously wounded outside his home in Zayouna, Baghdad from an attack by gunmen on 3 motorbikes. He died in Ibn Al-Nafees Hospital shortly after arrival.

References

External links 

Charities based in London
Democracy activists
International human rights organizations
International organisations based in London
Journalism organizations in Europe
Organizations established in 1991